Kernilis is a commune in the Finistère department of Brittany in northwestern France.

Population
Inhabitants of Kernilis are called in French Kernilisiens.

See also
Communes of the Finistère department

References

Mayors of Finistère Association ;

Communes of Finistère